Nnamdi Anusim (born 11 July 1972) is a Nigerian sprinter. He competed in the men's 4 × 100 metres relay at the 2000 Summer Olympics.

References

External links
 

1972 births
Living people
Athletes (track and field) at the 2000 Summer Olympics
Nigerian male sprinters
Olympic athletes of Nigeria